Cassava Ivorian bacilliform virus (CsIBV) is a pathogenic plant virus.

External links
 ICTVdB - The Universal Virus Database: Cassava Ivorian bacilliform virus
 Family Groups - The Baltimore Method

Viral plant pathogens and diseases
Bromoviridae